General elections were held in Bosnia and Herzegovina on 5 October 2002. Voter turnout was 55%.

The elections for the House of Representatives were divided into two; one for the Federation of Bosnia and Herzegovina and one for Republika Srpska. In the presidential election, voters in the Federation elected Bosniak Sulejman Tihić and Croat Dragan Čović, while voters in Republika Srpska elected Serb Mirko Šarović. The Party of Democratic Action emerged as the largest party in the House of Representatives, winning 10 of the 42 seats.

Electoral system
Voters elected 42 members to the national House of Representatives. In the Federation of Bosnia and Herzegovina, 98 members to its Federal House of Representatives, two representatives (one Bosniak and one Croat) to the tripartite state Presidency and ten cantonal assemblies were elected. In Republika Srpska (RS), 83 members to its National Assembly, the Serb representative of the tripartite state Presidency, one RS president and two RS vice-presidents were elected. There were 39 political parties, 11 coalitions, and 13 independent candidates. Voter turnout was 55%.

Results
The elections for the House of Representatives were divided into two; one for the Federation of Bosnia and Herzegovina and one for Republika Srpska. In the presidential election, each of the three national communities elected a Presidency member. Bosniaks elected Sulejman Tihić, Croats elected Dragan Čović and Serbs elected Mirko Šarović.

Presidency

House of Representatives

By entity

See also
2002 Republika Srpska general election

References

Elections in Bosnia and Herzegovina
General
Bosnia
Bosnia